Kemenli is a village in Mut district of Mersin Province, Turkey. It is in the wide valley of Göksu River in Toros Mountains. At  it is situated between Göksu River and the Turkish state highway . The population of the village was 587 as of 2012. The main economic activities of the village are animal breeding and agriculture. Main crop is apricot.

References

Villages in Mut District